The Flemish Ardennes (Dutch: Vlaamse Ardennen) is an informal name given to a hilly region in the south of the province of East Flanders, Belgium. Highest summit is the Hotondberg (145 m). Main characteristics of the region are rural hilly landscapes with hilltop bluebell woodlands (Muziekbos, Brakelbos, Kluisbos), windmills and watermills.

The area is distinct and not adjacent to the larger Ardennes, which is further to the south east of the country in Wallonia, France, Germany and Luxembourg.

Among the largest towns in the area are Oudenaarde, Ronse, Zottegem and Geraardsbergen.

Cycling is particularly popular in the Flemish Ardennes. Many major bike races are held here, including a large part of the Tour of Flanders. Most of its toughest climbs (Koppenberg, Taaienberg, Molenberg, Paterberg, Oude Kwaremont, Muur van Geraardsbergen, Eikenberg) and most of its cobblestone-street sections (Paddestraat) are situated in the Flemish Ardennes.

Photos

References
 Flemish Ardennes and South East-Flanders at Internet Archive
 Flemish Ardennes and South East-Flanders at Reocities

External links
Flemish Ardennes official website
 

Natural regions of Belgium
Areas of Belgium
Regions of Flanders
Landforms of Flanders
Landforms of East Flanders